Boshof is a farming town in the west of the Free State province, South Africa.

The town is 55 km north-east of Kimberley on the R64 road. Established in March 1856 on the farm Vanwyksvlei, which had been named after a Griqua who sowed his crops on it from time to time. Named in honour of Jacobus Nicolaas Boshof (1808-1881), second President of the Orange Free State (1855–59) and founder of its civil service. Became a municipality in 1872.

The local commando was involved in the siege of Kimberley, notably the disruption of the city’s water supply at Riverton. The Battle of Boshof, which resulted in the death of the Comte de Villebois-Mareuil, was fought nearby on 5 April 1900.

References

Populated places in the Tokologo Local Municipality
Populated places established in 1856
1856 establishments in the Orange Free State